Edward Joseph "Dummy"     “Ed”Dundon (July 10, 1859 – August 18, 1893) was an American professional baseball pitcher. He played for the Columbus Buckeyes for two seasons and was the first deaf player in Major League Baseball history.

Early life 

Dundon was born in Columbus, Ohio, in 1859. He was deaf, and from the age of nine, he attended the Ohio Institute for the Education of the Deaf and Dumb in Columbus. Dundon studied book binding and continued to work there as a book binder after graduating. He was also a pitcher for the school's baseball team.

Professional career 

Dundon joined the American Association's Columbus Buckeyes in 1883 and became the first deaf man in major league history. He had a win–loss record of 3–16, a 4.48 earned run average, and 31 strikeouts. The following season, he went 6–4 with a 3.78 ERA and 37 strikeouts.

Dundon then played for various minor league teams. In 1885, playing for Atlanta of the Southern League, he went 21–11 with a 1.30 ERA and 210 strikeouts. In 1887, he won 20 games again with Syracuse of the International League. Dundon was fined and suspended several times during this period for drinking. He retired from baseball in 1890.

Personal life 

In 1888, Dundon married Mary Lizzie Woolley, a classmate of his from the Ohio Institute. They had a son, Edwin Pius, in 1889.

Dundon died from consumption in 1893. He was buried at Mount Calvary Cemetery in Columbus.

References

External links 

1859 births
1893 deaths
19th-century baseball players
Major League Baseball pitchers
Columbus Buckeyes players
Atlanta Atlantas players
Acid Iron Earths players
Nashville Americans players
Syracuse Stars (minor league baseball) players
Columbus Senators players
Evansville Hoosiers players
Peoria Canaries players
Baseball players from Columbus, Ohio
American disabled sportspeople
Deaf baseball players
American deaf people
19th-century deaths from tuberculosis
Tuberculosis deaths in Ohio